Bad Kissingen is a Landkreis (district) in Bavaria, Germany. It is bounded by (from the northwest and clockwise) the district Main-Kinzig and Fulda in Hesse, and the districts of Rhön-Grabfeld, Schweinfurt and Main-Spessart.

History 
The district was established in 1972 by merging the former districts of Bad Kissingen, Bad Brückenau and Hammelburg.

Geography 
The district is located in the southern portion of the Rhön Mountains. The Fränkische Saale river (an affluent of the Main) enters the district in the north and leaves to the southwest.

Coat of arms 
The coat of arms displays:
 top: three icons symbolising the three spas of the district
 left: the eagle as well as the red and white pattern are from the arms of the county of Henneberg, which ruled the territory in the Middle Ages
 right: the cross from the arms of Fulda

Towns and municipalities

References

External links 

  (German)

 
Districts of Bavaria